Finian's Rainbow is a musical with a book by E. Y. Harburg and Fred Saidy, lyrics by Harburg, and music by Burton Lane, produced by Lee Sabinson. The original 1947 Broadway production ran for 725 performances, while a film version was released in 1968 and several revivals have followed.

An elderly Irishman, Finian McLonergan, moves to the southern United States with his daughter Sharon, to bury a stolen pot of gold near Fort Knox, in the mistaken belief that it will grow. Og, a leprechaun, follows them, desperate to recover his treasure before the loss of it turns him permanently human. Complications arise when a bigoted and corrupt U.S. senator gets involved, and when wishes are made inadvertently over the hidden crock. The Irish-tinged music score includes gospel and R&B influences.

Synopsis

Act I
The play opens in Rainbow Valley, Missitucky (a fictitious blend of Mississippi and Kentucky), near Fort Knox, home of a mixture of Black and White tobacco sharecroppers. The local sheriff and Buzz Collins, front man for local senator Billboard Rawkins, demand the locals pay their taxes or else have their land auctioned off. The sharecroppers want to wait for Woody Mahoney, their union leader. Woody's mute sister Susan the Silent communicates through dancing that Woody will bring the money, while a boy named Henry translates her dance for Collins and the sheriff. The sheriff begins the auction, but the sharecroppers refuse to listen and drag him and Collins off to meet Woody ("This Time of Year").
As they leave, an elderly Irishman called Finian McLonergan arrives with his daughter Sharon. They have come looking for Rainbow Valley, but Sharon misses their home in Ireland ("How Are Things in Glocca Morra"). Finian explains to Sharon that American millionaires convert their wealth into gold and bury it near Fort Knox. He concludes it is the soil in Fort Knox that makes the US rich, and reveals that he has a crock of gold stolen from a leprechaun, which he intends to bury. Woody and the sharecroppers reenter, and when Woody doesn't have enough money to pay the interest on the taxes, Finian pays the rest. Finian and Sharon are welcomed by the sharecroppers. Sharon explains her father's philosophy of following one's dream ("Look to the Rainbow").

That night, Finian buries the gold and marks the spot, only to be met by Og, the leprechaun he stole from. Without his gold, Og is slowly becoming mortal, and needs it back. Sharon and Woody come looking for Finian, but are soon distracted by the moonlight and each other ("Old Devil Moon").

Senator Rawkins is buying up land to fight progressive developers. He is not upset with losing Rainbow Valley until two geologists arrive to tell him gold has been detected in it. He vows to drive Finian and the sharecroppers off.

The next morning, Og meets Sharon and shyly confesses his feelings for her ("Something Sort of Grandish"). Sharon is in love with Woody, however, and Finian slyly prevents Woody from leaving for New York by making him suspect that another man is pursuing Sharon. The sharecroppers celebrate the unofficial betrothal of Sharon and Woody ("If This Isn't Love"). Og arrives and tells Finian he loves Sharon. He also warns Finian not to make wishes near the gold - after three wishes, the gold will vanish forever. Og enlists the local children to help find his gold, promising to get them anything from a magical catalogue ("Something Sort of Grandish [Reprise]").

As the sharecroppers sort the tobacco leaves, Maude, one of their leaders, explains the general unfairness of life to them ("Necessity"). Senator Rawkins arrives informing Finian and the sharecroppers that, by living with black people, they are breaking the law and must leave.  Outraged at the Senator's bigotry, Sharon tells him 'I wish to God you were black!' while unknowingly standing over the gold. The Senator is transformed into a black man and chased off the property by the Sheriff, who is unaware of the transformation. Woody brings news to Rainbow Valley that there is gold on their land, and the Shears-Robust shipping company has offered them all a free charge account. Insisting that credit is better than wealth, Woody and Finian tell them to use their new free credit rather than dig the gold. The group celebrates "That Great Come-and-get-it Day".

Act II

The sharecroppers begin unpacking extravagant gifts to themselves from their new accounts. Sharon and Finian celebrate the end of class-distinction that comes with wealth ("When the Idle Poor Become the Idle Rich"). Shears and Robust show up wondering when the gold will be discovered that will pay for the credit. Woody and Finian explain that there is no need to dig the gold up, since the news has led to massive investment in their tobacco label. Buzz and the Sheriff, however, accuse Sharon of using witchcraft to turn the Senator black. Woody orders them off. He and Sharon agree to marry ("Old Devil Moon [Reprise]"). Susan the Silent watches them, and dances by herself, and discovers the hidden gold ("Dance of the Hidden Crock"). She takes the gold for herself and hides it.

Meanwhile, the still-black Senator Rawkins is hiding in the woods. He meets Og and explains what happened to him. Og decides what the Senator needs is a new inside rather than a new outside. He uses his own magic to make the Senator a nicer person ("Fiddle Faddle"). In his new persona, Rawkins falls in with a group of black gospel singers looking for a fourth man ("The Begat"); by chance, they are all going to sing at Woody and Sharon's wedding. The wedding is interrupted by Buzz and the Sheriff, who have come to arrest her for witchcraft. The Senator tries to defend Woody and Sharon, but as a black man he lacks any authority over the Sheriff. Finian steps in, promising Sharon can change the Senator back. He dismisses everyone, intending to use the crock to undo her wish, but finds the crock gone.

Og, now almost human, looks for Sharon to tell her his feelings. He finds Susan instead, but realizes he is also attracted to her. He wonders if all human love is so fickle ("When I'm Not Near the Girl I Love"). Finian finds them and tells them Sharon is in danger. When Og reveals he doesn't have the gold, Finian runs off in despair. Susan knows where the gold is, but can't speak. Frustrated, Og wishes she could talk, not knowing the gold is under his feet. Susan speaks, and tells him she loves him. Og realizes there is only one wish left, and if he uses it to save Sharon, he cannot be a leprechaun again. He is unsure what to do until Susan kisses him. Deciding being human isn't so bad, Og wishes the Senator white again.

The Senator promises to be a better representative to the people, and the sharecroppers welcome Og and the now-verbal Susan ("If This Isn't Love [Reprise]"). Finian, however, has lost the crock and his hope of getting rich. Seeing that Sharon and Og have found their dreams, he goes off again in search of his own rainbow, saying 'Maybe there's no pot of gold at the end of it, but there's a beautiful new world under it.' The cast tells him goodbye, promising to see him in Glocca Morra ("Finale").

Production history

Original productions in New York and London
The original Broadway production opened on January 10, 1947, at the 46th Street Theatre, where it ran for 725 performances. It was directed by Bretaigne Windust, choreographed by Michael Kidd, with orchestrations by Robert Russell Bennett and Don Walker. The cast included Ella Logan as Sharon, Donald Richards as Woody, Albert Sharpe as Finian, with the Lyn Murray Singers. David Wayne won both the Tony Award for Best Featured Actor in a Musical (the first one ever given) and the Theatre World Award for his performance as Og. The show also received Tonys for Best Conductor and musical director (Milton Rosenstock) and Best Choreography.

A London production opened at the Palace Theatre on October 21, 1947, running for only 55 performances.

Revivals from 1955 to 2004
Finian's Rainbow was revived three times on Broadway by the New York City Center Light Opera Company. The brief 1955 production, directed by William Hammerstein and choreographed by Onna White, starred Helen Gallagher, Merv Griffin, and Will Mahoney, who was nominated for a Tony as Best Featured Actor in a Musical.  In 1960, Herbert Ross directed and choreographed a cast that included Jeannie Carson, Bobby Howes, Howard Morris, Sorrell Booke, and Robert Guillaume.  A third revival was staged by the company in 1967.  Although major revivals of the musical have been rare in recent decades, as the musical's treatment of bigotry against Black people in the American South has become dated, in 2004 the Irish Repertory Theatre staged a well-received off-Broadway production starring Melissa Errico, Jonathan Freeman, and Malcolm Gets.

Film adaptations
In 1954, an animated film adaptation began production, directed by John Hubley. The crew included Art Babbit, Bill Tytla and Paul Julian. Among the cast were Frank Sinatra, Ella Fitzgerald, Oscar Peterson, Louis Armstrong, Barry Fitzgerald, Jim Backus and David Burns plus David Wayne and Ella Logan from the original Broadway production. The era's McCarthyism caused financing to be withdrawn due to Hubley and Harburg's refusal to testify before the House Committee on Un-American Activities. Pre-production artwork, sketches from the storyboard, character designs, the script and some of the soundtrack recording have been recovered. Examples of the art and designs were published in the March/April 1993 issue of Print to illustrate an article by animation historian John Canemaker about the backstory of the project.

A 1968 film version with Fred Astaire, Tommy Steele, Petula Clark and Don Francks was directed by Francis Ford Coppola.

2009 Encores! Concert and Broadway revival
New York's City Center Encores! series performed a concert version of the musical from March 26, 2009, through March 29. Directed and choreographed by Warren Carlyle, it starred Jim Norton and Kate Baldwin as Finian and Sharon, with Cheyenne Jackson as Woody, Grammy nominated Blues artist Guy Davis as the blind harmonica-playing share cropper, and Jeremy Bobb as Og, the leprechaun.

A fully staged Broadway revival opened at the St. James Theatre  on October 29, 2009, with most of the Encores! cast and director-choreographer Carlyle returning. Notable replacements to the cast were Christopher Fitzgerald as Og the leprechaun, David Schramm as Senator Rawkins and Chuck Cooper as Rawkins transformed into a black man. Ernest Harburg, Yip Harburg's son and president of the Harburg Foundation, said "The satire of our economic system is particularly relevant right now [2009], given the nation’s deep financial woes."

The producers closed the show on January 17, 2010, stating that the "economic realities of Broadway today" did not allow them to play for as long as they had hoped.  The production sold approximately two-thirds of its seats for the 15-week run. Garth Drabinsky offered to try to rescue the revival and secure Canadian tour commitments, but the producers rejected his proposal.

The show was nominated for 2010 Tony Awards for Best Revival of a Musical, Best Leading Actress in a Musical (Baldwin) and Best Featured Actor in a Musical (Fitzgerald).

2014 London Fringe and Off-West End Revival
A fully staged London revival opened at the Union Theatre on February 12 – March 15, 2014. This production was directed by Phil Willmott and musically directed by Richard Baker, with choreography by Thomas Michael Voss, and starred James Horne as Finian, Christina Bennington as Sharon, Joseph Peters as Woody, Raymond Walsh as Og and Anne Odeke as Sister Anne and Rawkin's maid. The production later moved to the Charing Cross Theatre between April 2 and May 10 with the majority of the same cast and crew.

2016 Off-Broadway Revival
A fully staged revival, adapted and directed by Charlotte Moore, ran at the Irish Repertory Theatre in New York City from October 26, 2016, until January 29, 2017. The cast included Ken Jennings as Finian, Melissa Errico as Sharon, Ryan Silverman as Woody, Mark Evans as Og, Lyrica Woodruff as Susan and Dewey Caddell as Senator Rawkins.

Song list

 Act I
 "Overture" – Orchestra
 "This Time of the Year" – Ensemble
 "How Are Things in Glocca Morra?" – Sharon McLonergan
 "Look to the Rainbow" – Sharon McLonergan and Ensemble
 "Old Devil Moon" – Sharon McLonergan and Woody Mahoney
 "How Are Things in Glocca Morra?" (Reprise) – Sharon McLonergan
 "Something Sort of Grandish" – Sharon McLonergan and Og
 "If This Isn't Love" – Sharon McLonergan, Woody Mahoney and Ensemble
 "Something Sort of Grandish" (Reprise) – Og
 "Necessity" – Delores Martin, The Lyn Murray Singers, and Maude Simmons
 "That Great 'Come-and-Get-It' Day" – Sharon McLonergan, Woody Mahoney and Ensemble

 Act II
 "When the Idle Poor Become the Idle Rich" – Sharon McLonergan and Ensemble
 "Old Devil Moon" (Reprise) – Sharon McLonergan and Woody Mahoney
 "Fiddle Faddle" – Og
 "The Begat" – Senator Billboard Rawkins and Gospeleers
 "Look to the Rainbow" (Reprise) – Sharon McLonergan, Woody Mahoney and Ensemble
 "When I'm Not Near the Girl I Love" – Og and Susan Mahoney
 "If This Isn't Love" (Reprise) – Ensemble
 "Finale" – Company

Awards and nominations

Original Broadway production

1955 Broadway revival

2009 Broadway revival

Recording
An original cast recording released as a six-disc 78 rpm set by Columbia Records was the label's first recording of a Broadway musical.  The label used the album to introduce its new LP format in June 1948.  In 1988, the album was released on CD, and in 2000, a second CD version appeared that was remastered from the original acetates and restored some material originally recorded but cut from the show, including three bonus tracks in which Harburg discusses the writing of and sings "How Are Things in Glocca Morra?" and "When I'm Not Near the Girl I Love," as well as singing "Don't Pass Me By," a song cut from the show.

A recording of the original cast of the 1960 Broadway production, starring Jeannie Carson, Howard Morris, Biff McGuire, Carol Brice, Sorrell Booke and Bobby Howes was released on RCA Victor LSO-1057.

The 1963 Reprise Musical Repertory Theatre, a project of Frank Sinatra's Reprise Records, included a recording of the musical's songs by a variety of performers, though not in cast recording style.

In 1968 bandleader Stan Kenton released Finian's Rainbow featuring big band interpretations of tunes from the show.

A cast recording of the 2009 revival was recorded on December 7 by PS Classics and released on February 2, 2010.

Notes

References
Jefferson, Miles M. "The Negro on Broadway, 1946-1947" in Phylon (1940–1956), Vol. 8, No. 2 (2nd Qtr., 1947), pp. 146–159.
Audio clips and notes on the show and 2000 CD release by William Ruhlmann, from Allmusic

External links

 
 
2009 Broadway Revival
Finian's Rainbow JR. (children's version) at the Music Theatre International website
"New Musicals in Manhattan". Time. January 20, 1947.
NY Times review of the 2004 Irish Repertory Theatre production

1947 musicals
Broadway musicals
Musicals by Yip Harburg
Grammy Hall of Fame Award recipients
Original musicals
Tony Award-winning musicals
Leprechauns in popular culture